Gerson Levi-Lazzaris (born November 25, 1979 in Curitiba) is a Brazilian archaeologist, descendant of Ladin immigrants. Most of the Lazzaris are from Forno di Zoldo, Veneto, from where most of them emigrated during the end of the 19th century, and also after the Second World War to Argentina, Australia, Brazil and United States.

Biography 
In 1983, his family moved from Curitiba to São Paulo. At the age of 15 he moved to Lisbon, Portugal, following a short-experience in Finland. Accepted in the University of São Paulo, Levi-Lazzaris started his studies in Archaeology and History, focusing Anti-semitism in the Austro-Hungarian Empire (2003), obtaining his BA. In 2007 he obtained a master's degree in Archaeology in the same University of São Paulo based on an extensive dissertation about Middle Holocene hunter-gatherer societies in Southeast Brazil. He introduced the ecosystem approach in Brazilian archaeology. On March 2007 he was accepted as graduate student at Vanderbilt University.

Levi-Lazzaris has published articles ranging from political reviews in Trotskyite periodicals to scientific reviews and governamental reports. He has also translated books. Levi-Lazzaris developed his doctoral research in Roraima among the Ninam Indians, a Yanomamo subgroup, developing ethnoarchaeological studies in the Uraricoera valley. He was the second coordinator of the Frente de Proteção Etnoambiental Yanomami e Ye´kuana through FUNAI during 2010-2011.

References

1979 births
Living people
Brazilian people of Italian-Jewish descent
Brazilian people of Slovenian-Jewish descent
People from Curitiba
University of São Paulo alumni
Vanderbilt University alumni
Brazilian Jews